The 1999 South African Figure Skating Championships were held at the Carleton Centre Skyrink in Johannesburg on 20–24 September 1998. Skaters competed in the disciplines of men's and ladies' singles at the senior, novice, and pre-novice levels. There was also a junior and juvenile ladies' competition.

Senior results

Men

Ladies

External links
 Results

South African Figure Skating Championships, 1999
South African Figure Skating Championships